John A. Rowland House in the City of Industry, California was built in 1855. It was the home of pioneer John A. Rowland, of the Workman-Rowland party, co-leader of the first American band of settlers to reach Southern California in 1841. John A. Rowland built this home for his second wife, Charlotte M. Gray.

The John Rowland House is noteworthy for being the oldest surviving brick structure in Southern California. Built in 1855, the Greek Revival architecture style was used by John Rowland. Victoria, his daughter of the second marriage, inherited the home and in 1879 married Capt. John W. Hudson. The latter's daughter inherited the property and in 1920 married William Dibble of the Oakwell Rancho in Covina. It is undergoing many improvements in preparation for future reopening (the interior is currently closed due to earthquake damage).

Public access
The John A. Rowland House is maintained by the La Puente Valley Historical Society. Due to ongoing restoration efforts, the house and adjacent property are currently closed to the public. LPVHS occasionally conducts tours for local schools.

References

External links

 La Puente Valley Historical Society

Houses in Los Angeles County, California
Museums in Los Angeles County, California
Historic house museums in California
City of Industry, California
Houses completed in 1855
Houses on the National Register of Historic Places in California
Buildings and structures on the National Register of Historic Places in Los Angeles County, California
19th century in Los Angeles
Greek Revival houses in California